Uhtred of Lindisfarne was appointed as Bishop of Lindisfarne perhaps around 942. His death date is unknown.

Citations

References

External links
 

Bishops of Lindisfarne
10th-century English bishops
Year of birth unknown